Steven Ruggles (born May 8, 1955) is Regents Professor of History and Population Studies at the University of Minnesota, and the director of the Institute for Social Research and Data Innovation. He is best known as the creator of IPUMS, the world's largest population database. IPUMS provides information about two billion people residing in 107 countries between 1703 and the present, including every respondent to the surviving U.S. censuses of 1790 to 1940. He served as founding director of the Minnesota Population Center from 2000 to 2016. He served as the 2015 President of the Population Association of America, the first historian to hold the position. He also served as
President of the Association of Population Centers (2017–2018) and President of the Social Science History Association (2018–2019). He has been active on many national advisory and study committees, including the Census Bureau Scientific Advisory Committee; the National Science Foundation Social, Behavioral, and Economic Sciences Advisory Committee; the National Science Foundation Advisory Committee for CyberInfrastructure; and the National Academy of Sciences Board on Research Data and Information.

Ruggles received a Ph.D. in historical demography from the University of Pennsylvania in 1984. He has published extensively on historical demography, focusing especially on long-run changes in multi-generational families, single parenthood, divorce, and marriage, and on data and methods for population history. His study of the effects of demographic change on family structure  won the William J. Goode Book Award from the American Sociological Association and the Allen Sharlen Memorial Award from the Social Science History Association. Ruggles's work on migration censoring in family reconstitution stimulated a debate about biases introduced by the "Ruggles Effect."

In 2003, Ruggles received the Robert J. Lapham Award from the Population Association of America in recognition of lifetime contributions that blend research with the application of demographic knowledge to policy issues, and in 2009 he received the Warren E. Miller Award from the Inter-university Consortium for Political and Social Research for meritorious service to the social sciences. In 1995, Ruggles was described as the "King of Quant" by Wired Magazine, and in 2014, he was named “Wonkblog-Certified Data Wizard” by the Washington Post Wonkblog, which noted that losing to Steven Ruggles in Name That Data is kind of like losing to Adele on American Idol. In 2022 Ruggles was awarded a MacArthur "Genius" grant.

In 1994, Ruggles married Lisa Norling, another historian. They have two daughters.

Selected publications

Ruggles, Steven and Diana L. Magnuson.  Census Technology, Politics, and Institutional Change, 1790-2020. Journal of American History vol. 107 (2020), pp.  19-51
Ruggles, Steven. Historical Census Record Linkage. Annual Review of Sociology vol. 44 (2018), pp. 19–37
Ruggles, Steven. Patriarchy, Power, and Pay: The Transformation of American Families, 1800–2015. Demography, vol. 52 (2015), pp.  1797-1823
Ruggles, Steven. Big Microdata for Population Research. Demography, vol. 51 (2014), pp.  287-297
Kennedy, Sheela and Steven Ruggles. Breaking up is Hard to Count: The Rise of Divorce in the United States, 1980–2010.Demography, vol. 51 (2014), pp. 587–598
Ruggles, Steven. The Future of Historical Family Demography. Annual Review of Sociology vol. 38 (2012), pp. 423–441
Ruggles, Steven. Stem families and joint families in comparative historical perspective. Population and Development Review, vol. 36 (2010), pp. 563–577
Ruggles, Steven. Reconsidering the Northwest European Family System. Population and Development Review, vol. 35 (2009), pp. 321–332 
Ruggles, Steven. The Decline of Intergenerational Coresidence in the United States, 1850 to 2000. American Sociological Review, vol. 72 (2007), pp. 962–989
Patricia Kelly Hall and Steven Ruggles. 'Restless in the Midst of Their Prosperity': New Evidence on the Internal Migration of Americans, 1850–2000. Journal of American History, vol. 91 (2004), pp. 829–846
Ruggles, Steven and Susan Brower. Measurement of Household and Family Composition in the United States, 1850–2000. Population and Development Review, vol. 29 (2003), pp. 73–101

Ruggles, Steven. The Rise of Divorce and Separation in the United States, 1880–1990. Demography, vol. 34 (1997), pp. 962–989
Ruggles, Steven. The Transformation of American Family Structure. American Historical Review, vol. 99 (1994), pp. 103–128
Ruggles, Steven. The Origins of African-American Family Structure. American Sociological Review, vol. 59 (1994), pp. 136–151
Ruggles, Steven. Confessions of a Microsimulator: Problems in Modeling the Demography of Kinship. Historical Methods, vol. 26 (1993),  pp. 161–169
Ruggles, Steven. Migration, Marriage, and Mortality: Correcting Sources of Bias in English Family Reconstitutions. Population Studies, vol. 46 (1992), pp. 507–522

References

External links
Minnesota Population Center
Ruggles' publications page

1955 births
Living people
American demographers
University of Minnesota faculty